Amreli Lok Sabha constituency is one of the 26 Lok Sabha (parliamentary)  constituencies in Gujarat state in western India.

Assembly segments 
Presently, Amreli Lok Sabha constituency comprises seven Vidhan Sabha (legislative assembly) segments. These are:

Members of Parliament

Election Results

General Election 2019

General Election 2014

General Elections 2009

General Elections 2004

See also
 Amreli district
 List of Constituencies of the Lok Sabha

Notes

Lok Sabha constituencies in Gujarat
Amreli district